The Red Circle is a 1915 American drama film serial directed by Sherwood MacDonald. The film is considered to be lost although a short trailer for the film survives, as well as short paper print segments.  The Red Circle was Ruth Roland's first serial role.

Plot
The Red Circle is a birthmark, on the hand of the heroine, noticeable only in times of stress and
excitement, which forces her to steal, leading to no end of complications and intrigue.

Cast
 Ruth Roland as June Travers
 Frank Mayo as Dr. Max Lamar
 Philo McCullough
 Gordon Sackville as Chief of Police
 Corinne Grant as Mary, June's Nurse
 Mollie McConnell as Mrs. Travis
 Andrew Arbuckle
 Bruce Smith
 Bert Francis
 Ruth Lackaye
 Myrtle Reeves
 Daniel Gilfether as Circle Jim Barden
 Makoto Inokuchi as The Butler
 Gayne Whitman as Fred Whitman
 Frank Erlanger
 Edward Peters as Son of Circle

Episodes
The serial consisted of fourteen episodes:
Nevermore
Pity the Poor
Twenty Years Ago
In Strange Attire
Weapons of War
False Colors
Two Captives
Peace at Any Price
Dodging the Law
Excess Baggage
Seeds of Suspicion
Like a Rat in a Trap
Branded as a Thief
Judgement Day

See also
 List of film serials
 List of film serials by studio

References

External links

 
 Red circle : scénario (résumé conforme à la vue) avec photogrammes on Gallica

1915 films
1915 drama films
American silent serial films
American black-and-white films
Silent American drama films
Articles containing video clips
Lost American films
1910s American films